Brockway Township may refer to:

 Brockway Township, Michigan
 Brockway Township, Minnesota

Township name disambiguation pages